This is a list of Spanish television related events in 1992.

Events 
 18 June: After Grupo Zeta, backed by Rupert Murdoch & Banesto, becomes major stockholder of  Antena 3, its CEO, Antonio Asensio is appointed President of the TV channel.
 25 July: 1992 Summer Olympics opening ceremony, is broadcast worldwide by Televisión Española.
 5 December: Francisco wins the Festival de la OTI with the song A dónde voy sin ti.

Debuts

Television shows

Ending this year

Foreign series debuts in Spain

Births 
 19 July - Eduardo García, actor.
 29 August - Elena Rivera, actress
 20 September - David Castillo, actor.

Deaths 
 2 March - Cándida Losada, actress, 76
 7 May - Simón Cabido, cómico, 61
 24 May - Javier Basilio, journalist, 63
 23 September - Mary Santpere, actress, 79
 16 November - Estanis González, actor, 67

See also
1992 in Spain
List of Spanish films of 1992

References 

1992 in Spanish television